Shift-based hiring is a recruitment concept pioneered in Singapore that hires people for individual shifts, rather than hiring employees before scheduling them into shifts. Originally, it was intended as an efficient way to schedule part-time work that is shift based but it is now known that this concept can be applied to any job that requires a number of consecutive hours of commitment as a shift. This hiring concept focuses on employing workers for a particular shift on that particular day, rather than focusing on employing a worker to work recurrent shifts that can become part-time or full-time work, although the latter can be a result of employing a worker to work shifts that run on the same timing periodically. Every shift or a group of recurring shifts may be a unique job posting.

It is also to be juxtaposed against zero-hour contract, as employees are not bound by the contract to be on standby everyday and to be able to work whenever the employer needs additional labour. The employee adopts a proactive role in the sense that he, after viewing all the vacant shifts, offers his service for the shifts he is willing to work for, as compared to the employer offering the employee a shift that he or she might not want. The bargaining power does not lie solely with the employer, since employers hire employees for one or more shifts. The employer has the flexibility to scale up or down its labour demand, while employees have the flexibility to choose the shifts they want to work.

Feasibility

Employing workers based on shifts is administratively complex for a manager. Finding workers to work for individual shifts means posting individual job advertisements in classified advertisements or through online employment websites. Cloud-based management programmes are used to streamline and combine these individual shift-hiring requirements into a schedule or calendar. These work in a similar format to other cloud-based talent management marketplaces. An online marketplace is created for employees and employers to meet, apply for jobs and recruit in real time in a cloud-based environment. It provides real time update and management to both the employees and the employers, such that the employees will know at the first instance when the work schedule is confirmed. The employers can respond to any new applications by the employees immediately. Furthermore, any changes in the employees’ schedule and commitment is transmitted real time back to the employer, so that contingency measures (if needed) can be taken as soon as possible.

Scheduling

With workers elected and hired only for specific shifts, the scheduling of such workers is a by-product of the hiring process and there is no need for the extra process of matching each workers’ schedules into the business operation needs.

A platform that allows monitoring of each shift's staffing level by the manager is usually required. In contrast to automated scheduling software that rely on algorithms to optimise service hours and minimise manpower costs, a shift-based hiring approach delegates the role of filling the duty roster to ensure the appropriate staffing levels back to the managers and the team of workers. Rather than relying on an algorithm to assign shifts which has been shown to place a high human-factors cost on the team worker, shift-based hiring leverages on its cloud-based nature and crowd-sourcing ideas to ensure that the staffing level needs are transparently communicated to managers and the team in real-time and managers get to assign or have workers bid for their shifts in a dynamic way to meet the staffing needs.

Example

John is finding work at a food and beverage outlet. However, he has a very busy schedule that is not recurrent. A particular 2-week forecast could probably only allow him to work these hours:

Week 1 Monday: 4pm – 7 pm
Week 1 Thursday: 7pm – 11pm
Week 1 Saturday: 1pm – 4pm

Week 2 Tuesday: 7pm – 11pm
Week 2 Friday: 9am – 1pm
Week 2 Sunday: 4pm – 7pm

A conventional employer might be put off by such an erratic schedule because of the administrative complexity of fixing everyone's schedule to manage business operations.  Yet if a company is hiring based on individual shifts, the company can employ John to work on all 6 days that he is free. This is with consideration that the main hiring pedagogy of the manager is to fill up the individual shifts, and not to find employees who can work as many shifts as possible.

Application to the service sector

As economies move up the economic ladder and tertiary sectors such as the service sector grow in the economy, the standard 9 – 5 jobs that were prevalent in manufacturing industries have a weakening presence as a proportion of the economy. Service sectors often cater to the free time of these workers, which are their break times and after work periods. The working hours of service sectors cannot fit into the 9 to 5 job timings, and thus businesses instead maximise their operations in certain periods of a day. There is a demand for more labour during peak periods and less during non-peak. The diversification of work hours to maximise business profitability exemplifies the applicability of shift based hiring in such sectors.

As the idea of work life balance start to gain traction in society, people start to fit their job into their schedules, instead of fitting their schedules into their work. Work is less seen as the centre point of one's life where other priorities revolve round one's job. This calls for more flexible arrangements demanded in societies.

Difference with current recruitment avenues
This is contrasted against the current recruitment concepts in a way that the shift based hiring is not for a particular position required for part time or full time work, but it is just recruiting for that particular shift on that particular day. Every shift on each day can be seen as though that it is a unique job posting.

Advantages

Advantages to employers
Scalable hiring based on needs - Hiring by shifts allows managers to expand or reduce the manpower recruited on a needs basis. There can also be different pay incentives for different shifts on different days to optimise business cost and operability. A manager who forecasts a spike in sales on one of the days in the following week can increase the number of workers to be hired for that particular shift, or adjust the wage for that shift alone to attract more labour.
"Try-before-you-buy" - In economics, potential employees send signals to the employers through their resume and interviews in an attempt to impress upon the interviewer to land the job. Shift based hiring allows employers to further "test the waters" on the workers’ suitability for the job by only committing to hiring the employee for one single shift, allowing employers to better select suitable employees to work for the company, before accepting these employees for more shifts.
Conflicts of interests are minimized - With the manager scheduling workers into the shifts required of the business, unhappiness arises when all the needs of the workers is not met by the manager in their work schedule. Using programs that automatically schedule workers into their shifts purely based on business needs has shown to exacerbate the situation by not engaging with the workers in hearing out and addressing on their needs. With shift based hiring, the responsibility is back in the hands of the managers to engage their workers.
Higher Job Satisfaction and Productivity - With the flexibility in work hours with shift based hiring, job satisfaction has been argued to potentially increase as it is seen as a way of engaging employees in a positive manner. This also leads to other positive impacts such as higher job productivity, and can reduce the number of no-shows and shirking occurrences.

Advantages to employees
Flexibility - Employees can tailor their work schedule to their own needs, finding jobs that can cater to their other commitments. They have the choice to increase their work hours, or even try new jobs while not sacrificing the chance to work back in the current company.
"Try-before-you-buy" - Similarly for the employees, shift based hiring allows them to gain a deeper understanding on how working in the business is like by committing to a shift. They can then make a more informed decision on whether or not to continue working more shifts on a longer basis with the company.
Influence in own Work Schedule - Shift based hiring brings the decision making power of employees to work back to themselves. Using scheduling software that run on algorithms have resulted in shift schedules that do not provide enough rest for some workers, who sometimes "clopen" (a term used to refer to an employee having to close the shop on the first day and having to open it on the second day). While some of these employees were reported to actually want to work "clopenings", these scheduling software often do not address the needs of those employees who do not want to. Shift based hiring allows employees to make their own decisions on when they want to work.

Limitations

Cost of on job training
On job training is required for most jobs, and the cost of on job training might be too large for companies, given the risk that some employees might quit only after working for one shift. That might deter companies from embarking on a shift based hiring scheme after weighing their own costs and benefits.

Industries with inelastic supply / inflexible production period / long production period
Manpower is only one of the production inputs for businesses. Although manpower can possibly be scalable in the short run, other inputs such as raw materials, long production periods and time lag in responding to change in demand can render the benefits of shift based hiring ineffective.

Job nature dependent
Shift based hiring will be better suited to industries and job natures that are transactional. These often entail duties that can be done in a short period of time or within the shift that is applied for. Examples included (but are not limited to): service and kitchen crew in the food and business industry, sales crew in retail industry, logistics and support crew in logistical companies, etc. Recruiting people for a role that requires commitment over a few days or on a project basis will not be feasible via shift based hiring, for the whole idea of recruitment is only for the shift on that particular day.

Emerging demand for flexible shifts scheduling and hiring
As work life integration becomes more and more of a choice for many workers, employees seek to have more flexibility in deciding their shift timings. It has been propounded that the inability of employers to introduce flexibility in shift timings is a potential pain point for employees who have to balance non-work commitments with their work commitments. It might also become a source of conflict for employees with heavy family responsibilities, such as that of a caregiver. Incremental benefits can be reaped from allowing workers to work in shifts based on their family needs or natural work rhythms, where job satisfaction and productivity can increase with greater employee engagement.

References 

Recruitment